The 2018–19 Iowa Hawkeyes women's basketball team represented the University of Iowa during the 2018–19 NCAA Division I women's basketball season. The Hawkeyes, led by 19th year head coach Lisa Bluder, played their home games at Carver–Hawkeye Arena in Iowa City, IA as members of the Big Ten Conference. They finished the season 29–7, 14–4 in Big Ten play to finish in second place. Iowa won the Big Ten Conference tournament championship game over Maryland, 90–76. They received an automatic bid to the NCAA women's tournament as the No. 2 seed in the Greensboro region where they defeated Mercer and Missouri in the first and second rounds, NC State in the sweet sixteen to advance to the elite eight for the first time since 1993. They lost to eventual national champion Baylor in the elite eight.

Roster

Schedule and results

|-
!colspan=9 style=| Exhibition

|-
!colspan=9 style=| Non-conference regular season

|-
!colspan=9 style=| Big Ten conference season

|-
!colspan=9 style=| Big Ten Women's Tournament

|-
!colspan=9 style=| NCAA Women's Tournament

Rankings

^Coaches did not release a Week 2 poll.

See also
2018–19 Iowa Hawkeyes men's basketball team

References

Iowa Hawkeyes women's basketball seasons
Iowa
Iowa Hawkeyes
Iowa Hawkeyes
Iowa